Salahudin (born 30 January 1970) is an Indonesian retired footballer, who previously played for Barito Putera, Mitra Kalteng, PSS Sleman, and Persegi Gianyar.

Careers 
Salahudin represented the Indonesia national team. He earned several caps in 1991, including the 1991 Southeast Asian Games. In the 2011/2012 season of Liga Indonesia Premier Division, he brought Barito Putera to become champions, and was promoted to Indonesia Super League in 2013.

Honours

As a player

Sea games 1991, Indonesia national football team, Gold medals, 1991

As a managers

Indonesia Soccer Championship B, Perssu Sumenep,  Third-place, 2016
Liga Indonesia Premier Division, PS Barito Putera, Champions, 2011/2012
Liga Indonesia Second Division, PS Barito Putera, Champions, 2008/2009
Liga Indonesia First Division, Kalteng Putra F.C., Champions, 2006/2007

References 

1970 births
Association football defenders
Living people
Indonesian footballers
Indonesia international footballers
PS Barito Putera players
Mitra Kukar players
Persegi Gianyar players
PSS Sleman players
Indonesian Premier Division players
Southeast Asian Games gold medalists for Indonesia
Southeast Asian Games medalists in football
Competitors at the 1991 Southeast Asian Games
People from Palembang